Tymbira is a genus of South American tangled nest spiders containing the single species, Tymbira brunnea. It was  first described by Cândido Firmino de Mello-Leitão in 1944, and has only been found in Argentina.

References

Amaurobiidae
Monotypic Araneomorphae genera
Spiders of Argentina
Taxa named by Cândido Firmino de Mello-Leitão